Kimberly Jessup is an American politician who has served in the Vermont House of Representatives since 2017.

A member of the Democratic Party, Jessup serves on the House Committee on Appropriations, the House Ethics Panel, the Spousal Support and Maintenance Task Force, and the Judicial Nominating Board.

Jessup's legislative priorities include "[i]ssues around family financial security and environmental challenges."

References

External links

Living people
University of California, Berkeley alumni
School of International and Public Affairs, Columbia University alumni
Democratic Party members of the Vermont House of Representatives
21st-century American politicians
21st-century American women politicians
Women state legislators in Vermont
Year of birth missing (living people)